Lawrence J. Prelli is Professor and Chair of the Communications Department at the University of New Hampshire. He is known for his book on rhetoric of science, A Rhetoric of Science: Inventing Scientific Discourse (1990), which has been well-reviewed and cited.

References

Year of birth missing (living people)
Living people
University of New Hampshire faculty